John Inderwick was a tobacco pipe maker and property developer.

He founded a tobacconist shop in Wardour Street in 1797.  This continued as Inderwick & Co for many years, being located at number 45 in Carnaby Street when that street became fashionable in the Swinging Sixties.  He introduced the Meerschaum pipe to London and bought a mine in Crimea to supply sepiolite for these.

Having become prosperous, he invested in property development in Kensington which was built up during the 18th century.  He developed a substantial estate of six and half acres which became known as Kensington New Town and then followed this with a similar scheme at Kensington Gate.  At the time of his death in 1867, he also owned properties in Haverstock Hill, Camden Town, Woolwich and the West End of London.

References

 Home builders
 Pipe makers
 Tobacconists